Eizenberg is a variant if the German and Ashkenazi Jewish surname Eisenberg in some other languages.
Notable people with the surname include:
Eyal Eizenberg (born 1963, Israeli general
Julie Eizenberg, founder of Koning Eizenberg Architecture, American architecture firm

See also

Aizenberg